Grupo Desportivo de Ribeirão, known as Ribeirão, is a Portuguese football club based in Ribeirão, Vila Nova de Famalicão, Braga District. Founded in 1968, it currently plays in the Portuguese Third Division, holding home matches at Estádio do Passal, which has a capacity of 3,000.

Appearances
Segunda Divisão: 19
Terceira Divisão: 19

League history

References

External links
Zerozero team profile

Football clubs in Portugal
Association football clubs established in 1968
1968 establishments in Portugal